Legend of the Shadowking is the sixth full-length album by the German power metal band Freedom Call. It was released on 1 February 2010 via SPV.

Track list

Credits
Chris Bay – vocals, guitar
Lars Rettkowitz – guitar
Samy Saemann – bass guitar
Dan Zimmermann – drums

References 

Freedom Call albums
2010 albums
SPV/Steamhammer albums